The Sauber C13 was a Formula One car. It was designed by André de Cortanze and Leo Ress for use by the Sauber Team in the 1994 Formula One season. The car was powered by an Ilmor 3.5L V10 engine badged as a Mercedes-Benz. The development of this car signalled Mercedes-Benz's return to Formula One, providing their first engine for an F1 car since 1955. Drivers for the team throughout the season were Karl Wendlinger, Andrea de Cesaris, JJ Lehto and Heinz-Harald Frentzen. Only Frentzen drove for the entire season.

From the Spanish Grand Prix, the car ran with higher cockpit sides after Wendlinger suffered severe injuries in a side-on accident during qualifying at the Monaco Grand Prix which left him in a coma. Higher cockpit sides were later made mandatory for all cars in the  season, and were still in use up to 2017, when they were integrated with the "halo" system.

The C13 raced with Broker as main title sponsor until the 1994 French Grand Prix, when Tissot replaced them on the car.

The C13 was replaced for the  season by the Sauber C14.

Race results
(key)

References

1994 Formula One season cars
C13